David Green  is an economist and university administrator. Has been Vice-Chancellor of the University of Worcester since 2003. In 2018, he was appointed a CBE for services to higher education. He has been Deputy Lieutenant of Worcestershire since 2021.

Selected works

References

External links
Portrait by Kathy Priddis

Year of birth missing (living people)
Living people
Academics of the University of Worcester
British economists
Vice-Chancellors by university in England
Deputy Lieutenants of Worcestershire